Rahmat Ullah Dard (1937-2016), was a Pashto-language ghazal poet. He died at the age of 82. He was a famous Pashto Poet and has rendered extraordinary contributions to the language of Pashto. Ahmed Jan Marwat has penned down a book on both Rahmatullah Dard and Abdur Rahim Majzoob poetry. He has carried out a comparative analysis of their poetry. Said Ul Amin Ahsan Kheshgi has written down an article about the poetry and life of Professor Rahmatullah Dard. Dard also wrote poetry in Urdu.

Books
He wrote the following notable books: Apart from that, all these books are incorporated in a single book named as "Da Dard Kulyat" 
Ghazal
Dard
Muntakhib Dard
Wafa
Noon na tar Noon
Hagha Stargy che Ghagegi
Wyal Sarhi

References

Pashto-language poets
1937 births
2016 deaths